Kill or Be Kind is the sixth studio album by American singer-songwriter Samantha Fish. It was released on September 20, 2019 under Rounder Records.

The album was produced by Scott Billington at Royal Studios in Memphis, Tennessee.

Critical reception

Kill or Be Kind was met with generally favorable reviews from critics. At Metacritic, which assigns a weighted average rating out of 100 to reviews from mainstream publications, this release received an average score of 80, based on 5 reviews.

Track listing

Personnel 
Adapted from Rock and Blues Muse.
 Samantha Fish – vocals, guitar
 Austin Clements – bass
 Rick Steff – Hammond B3 and synthesizer
 Andriu Yanovski – Moog synthesizer
 Doug Belote – drums
 Jim Spake – saxophone
 Tom Clary – trumpet
 Anjelika Joseph – vocals
 Kayla Jasmine – vocals

Charts

References

2019 albums
Samantha Fish albums
Rounder Records albums